André Gaumond (3 June 1936 – 14 December 2019) was a Canadian Roman Catholic bishop.

Gaumond was born in Canada and was ordained to the priesthood in 1961. He served as bishop of the Roman Catholic Diocese of Sainte-Anne-de-la-Pocatière, Canada, from 1985 to 1995. He then served as coadjutor archbishop of the Roman Catholic Archdiocese of Sherbrooke, Canada, in 1995 and 1996. Gaumond then served as archbishop of the Sherbrooke Archdiocese from 1996 to 2011.

References

External links

1936 births
2019 deaths
21st-century Roman Catholic archbishops in Canada
Roman Catholic archbishops of Sherbrooke
Roman Catholic bishops of Sainte-Anne-de-la-Pocatière